Football 5-a-side at the 2012 Summer Paralympics was held in London at the Riverbank Arena, from 31 August to 8 September. Football 5-a-side is played by athletes with visual impairment, with a ball with a noise making device inside.

For these games, the men competed in an 8-team tournament. Brazil were the favourites since they had won both in Athens 2004 and in Beijing 2008; they were also the defending world champions.

Qualifying

Squads

Each of the eight participating nations submitted a squad of ten men – eight blind or visually impaired players and two sighted goalkeepers. For the first time, the sighted players were awarded medals as part of their team.

Group stage

Group A

Group B

Knockout stage

Classification round

5th–8th place semi-finals

7th–8th place match

5th–6th place match

Medal round

Semi-finals

Bronze medal match

Gold medal match

Medallists

See also
Football 7-a-side at the 2012 Summer Paralympics
Football at the 2012 Summer Olympics

References

External links
"Football 5-a-side" , The official site of the London 2012 Olympic and Paralympic Games

 
2012
2012 Summer Paralympics events
2012